The 2004 Subway 400 was a NASCAR Nextel Cup Series race held on February 22, 2004, at North Carolina Speedway in Richmond County, North Carolina. The race was the second of the 2004 NASCAR Nextel Cup Series season.

Ryan Newman of Penske Racing won the pole position, while Matt Kenseth of Roush Racing won the race. The race was the final Cup race at the track due to poor attendance, as the race date was later given to Phoenix International Raceway; only 50,000 were in attendance at the 60,113 facility.

The other Cup race at the track, the Pop Secret Microwave Popcorn 400, had been replaced by California Speedway after 2003.

Entry list

Qualifying
Dodges were the top four fastest, with Newman, Jamie McMurray, Kasey Kahne and Rusty Wallace. Morgan Shepherd and Andy Belmont failed to qualify after the two crashed in practice. Ryan McGlynn and Larry Gunselman also withdrew.

The entry list for the race was short, which led to a group of field-fillers entering the race, including Joe Ruttman, starting in his first Cup race since 1995, Kirk Shelmerdine, who made only two Cup Series starts since 1994, Carl Long, who started twice in 2001, and Andy Hillenburg, who failed to qualify for the 2004 Daytona 500. Hillenburg, who ran just six laps in the two practice sessions prior to the race, expressed interest in running the full race, stating, "I don't want to look like we're trying to capitalize on anything, but this is our window of opportunity. We're not here to go two laps and try to get a check. We're here to do the best we can." After the race, rumors arose whether NASCAR had requested the field-fillers to appear and complete the 43-car field with the reward of money, possibly to satisfy television contracts, NASCAR vice president Jim Hunter denied the allegations.

Qualifying results 
1.Ryan Newman No.12 ALLTEL Dodge Penske Racing 156.475mph

2.Jamie McMurray No.42 Texaco Havoline Dodge Chip Ganassi Racing 155.379mph

3.Kasey Kahne* No.9 Dodge Dealers/UAW Dodge Evernham Motorsports 154.814mph

4.Rusty Wallace No.2 Miller Lite Dodge Penske Racing 154.644mph

5.Jeff Gordon No.24 Dupont Chevrolet Hendrick Motorsports 154.318mph

6.Jeremy Mayfield No.19 Dodge Dealers/UAW Dodge Evernham Motorsports 154.195mph

7.Dale Earnhardt Jr. No.8 Budweiser Chevrolet Dale Earnhardt Incorporated 154.149mph

8.Jeff Green No.43 STP/Cheerios Dodge Petty Enterprises 154.117mph

9.Dale Jarrett No.88 UPS Ford Robert Yates Racing 154.078mph

10.Greg Biffle No.16 Subway/National Guard Ford Roush Racing 154.026mph

11.Bobby Labonte No.18 Interstate Batteries Chevrolet Joe Gibbs Racing 154.020mph

12.Joe Nemechek No.01 US Army Chevrolet MB2 Motorsports 153.987mph

13.Casey Mears No.41 Target Dodge Chip Ganassi Racing 153.942mph

14.Sterling Marlin No.40 Coors Light Dodge Chip Ganassi Racing 153.942mph

15.Brendan Gaughan* No.77 Kodak/Jasper Engines Dodge Penske/Jasper Racing 153.748mph

16.Ward Burton No. 0 Netzero HiSpeed Chevrolet Haas CNC Racing 153,690mph

17. Ricky Craven No.32 Tide Chevrolet PPI Motorsports 153.619mph

18.Ken Schrader No.49 Schwan's Home Service Dodge BAM Racing 153.413mph

19.Scott Riggs* No.10 Valvoline Chevrolet MBV Motorsports 153.297mph

20.Brian Vickers* No.25 GMAC Financial Services Chevrolet Hendrick Motorsports 153.169mph

21.Mark Martin No. 6 Viagra Ford Roush Racing 153.015mph

22.Ricky Rudd No.21 Motorcraft Ford Wood Brothers Racing 152.984mph

23.Matt Kenseth No.17 DeWalt Ford Roush Racing 152.945mph

24.Tony Stewart No.20 Home Depot Chevrolet Joe Gibbs Racing 152.875mph

25.Elliott Sadler No.38 M&M's Ford Robert Yates Racing 152.798mph

26.Kevin Lepage No.4 YokeTV.com Chevrolet Morgan-McClure Racing 152.792mph

27.Kurt Busch No.97 Sharpie Ford Roush Racing 152.633mph

28.Jeff Burton No.99 SKF Ford Roush Racing 152.486mph

29.Jimmie Johnson No.48 Lowe's Chevrolet Hendrick Motorsports 152.480mph

30.Kyle Petty No.45 Georgia Pacific Dodge Petty Enterprises 152.353mph

31.Scott Wimmer* No.22 Caterpillar Dodge Bill Davis Racing 152.290mph

32.Kevin Harvick No.29 GM Goodwrench Chevrolet Richard Childress Racing 152.220mph

33.Michael Waltrip No.15 NAPA Auto Parts Chevrolet Dale Earnhardt Incorporated 152.119mph

34.Robby Gordon No.31 Cingular Wireless Chevrolet Richard Childress Racing 152.024mph

35.Terry Labonte No.5 Kellogg's ChevroletHendrick Motorsports 151.722mph

36.Johnny Sauter* No. 30 America Online Chevrolet Richard Childress Racing 151.283mph

37.Derrike Cope No.50 Arnold Development Companies Dodge Derrike Cope 151.283mph

38.Larry Foyt No.14 AJ Foyt Racing Dodge AJ Foyt Racing 151.221mph

39.John Andretti No.1 Snap-On/Nilla Chevrolet Dale Earnhardt Incorporated 150.481mph (provisional)

40.Joe Ruttman No.09 Phoenix Racing Dodge Phoenix Racing 145.142mph (provisional)

41.Kirk Shelmerdine No.172 Tucson Ford Kirk Shelmerdine 145.661mph

42.Carl Long No.146 Glenn Underwater Services Dodge Glenn Racing 148.739mph

43.Andy Hillenburg No.280 Commercial Truck & Trailer Ford Stanton Hover 146.859mph

* Rookie of the Year contender.

Race
After one lap was completed, Joe Ruttman, who started 40th and did not make any attempts to practice, was ordered to park by NASCAR for not having a pit crew and collected $54,196. NASCAR eventually admonished Phoenix Racing owner James Finch for the incident. Kirk Shelmerdine was lapped after eight minutes and finished 42nd after not reaching the minimum speeds mandated by NASCAR, and was paid $54,895. Carl Long finished 38th after barrel-rolling on the backstretch. Andy Hillenburg managed to finish the race in 34th and 17 laps down, earning $55,425.

Pole-sitter Ryan Newman led the first two laps before getting passed by Jamie McMurray, who led until the first caution flag was waved for Ken Schrader's crash in turns one and two. Jeff Gordon took the lead, leading until lap 53 when Kyle Petty crashed. McMurray and Robby Gordon exchanged the lead during the caution period, while Newman, Jeff Gordon, and Matt Kenseth swapped the lead changes during the 71-lap green flag period, with Schrader and Jimmie Johnson's accident on lap 131 bringing out another caution. On lap 134, Kenseth claimed the lead and led for 79 consecutive laps until lap 214, when a debris caution came out. Despite Kevin Harvick briefly taking first, Kenseth regained the lead and led for 87 more laps. During those laps, on lap 265, Long collided with Joe Nemechek, flipped down the backstretch, and landed in the turn 3 apron. With 42 laps left, Robby Gordon crashed, and McMurray eventually passed Kenseth and Kasey Kahne, but NASCAR ruled that Kenseth and Kahne were finishing their pit stops and were leaving pit road, and as the field was frozen, McMurray's pass was voided. Kenseth battled Kahne for the win, and on the final lap, defeated Kahne by .01 seconds, while McMurray finished third. McMurray's team owner Chip Ganassi confronted the NASCAR haulers about Kenseth and Kahne's wave around; Ganassi stated, "We just got robbed in front of 100,000 people."

Standings after the race

References

Subway 400
Subway 400
NASCAR races at Rockingham Speedway